St. Rose of Lima Park is a split Sacramento RT Light Rail station, located near the park named in honor of Rose of Lima, in Downtown Sacramento, California.  From the RT light rail's inception in 1987, it consisted of only two platforms at the vicinity:  the northbound one (towards Watt/I-80) at the intersection of 9th and K Streets, and the former southbound one at 7th and K Streets.  When RT expanded the light rail system in 2007 to serve Sacramento Valley station, it added the northbound-only 8th and K Streets station. Today, the 9th street platform is marked as "St. Rose of Lima Park" while the platform in the middle on 8th Street is simply marked as "8th and K".

The 9th & K platform is served by the Blue Line only, while the 8th & K platform is served by the Gold and Green Lines.  With a daily average of 3,900 riders, the St. Rose of Lima Park station is the third busiest in the RT light rail system behind Meadowview and 16th Street stations.  It serves the Golden 1 Center, nearby downtown office buildings and Downtown Commons (formerly Downtown Plaza), an entertainment and shopping complex that anchors the arena.

Closure of 7th & K
The original southbound 7th & K station platform was built in 1987, and was located on K Street between 7th and 8th Streets.  It was moved in 2010 to its current location on 7th Street south of K Street, just around the corner of the same block.  It was served by all three RT light rail lines at the time, although only the Blue Line originally served the platform before the relocation.  Despite the "new" 7th & K station being across the street from the new Golden 1 Center, it was one block north of the 7th & Capitol station platform.  RT officials deemed the location too close to another light rail station, and also considered the design inadequate due to being on a slope in the block.  So after extensive feedback, the 7th & Capitol platform was closed from 2015 to 2016 for renovations, also to handle passenger loads for the Sacramento Kings home games at Golden 1 Center.  When that station reopened, 7th & K was closed permanently on September 30, 2016.

Platforms and tracks

See also
Sacramento Regional Transit District

References

 

Sacramento Regional Transit light rail stations
Railway stations in the United States opened in 1987
Railway stations closed in 2016